Giovanni Pettinelli (born 13 March 1996) is an Italian professional rugby union player who primarily plays flanker for Benetton of the United Rugby Championship. He has also represented Italy at international level.

Professional career 
Pettinelli began his career at Calvisano in the Top12 before moving to Benetton ahead of the 2018–19 Pro14 season. While at Calvisano he made a single loan appearance for Zebre against Ospreys in the Pro12 on 2 September 2016.

Pettinelli was a member of the Italy squad at the 2016 Six Nations Under 20s Championship, and he scored a try against Ireland in the fourth round. He was also a member of the Italy squad at the 2016 World Rugby Under 20 Championship and of the Emerging Italy squad for the annual World Rugby Nations Cup in 2018. On the 14 October 2021, he was selected by Alessandro Troncon to be part of an Italy A 28-man squad for the 2021 end-of-year rugby union internationals, having made his test debut against Argentina during the 2021 Autumn Nations Series.

Pettinelli was called up to the Italy squad for the first time ahead of the 2020 Six Nations Championship. On the 31 October 2021, he was selected by Kieran Crowley to be part of an Italy 34-man squad for the 2021 end-of-year rugby union internationals.He made his debut against Argentina.

References

External links 

Giovanni Pettinelli at United Rugby Championship
Giovanni Pettinelli at European Professional Club Rugby
Giovanni Pettinelli at Benetton Rugby

Italian rugby union players
Rugby union flankers
Rugby Calvisano players
Zebre Parma players
Benetton Rugby players
Sportspeople from Venice
Living people
1996 births
Italy international rugby union players